The World Government Summit is an annual event held in Dubai, United Arab Emirates. It brings together leaders in government for a global dialogue about governmental process and policies with a focus on the issues of futurism, technology innovation and other topics. The summit acts as a knowledge exchange hub between government officials, thought leaders, policy makers and private sector leaders and as an analysis platform for the future trends, issues and opportunities facing humanity. The summit hosts over 90 speakers from 150 participating countries, along with over 4000 attendees.

History 
The World Government Summit was formed by a team of experts from different disciplines to bring government, business and civil society together with the goal of improving the future for the seven billion people on the planet. The chairman of the World Government Summit is Mohammad Al Gergawi with Ohood bint Khalfan Al Roumi serving as Vice Chairman of the organization.  Omar Sultan AlOlama is the Managing Director of the World Government Summit.

In 2015, under the directives of His Highness Sheikh Mohammad Bin Rashid Al Maktoum, Mohammad Al Gergawi, chairman of the summit's organizing committee and minister of the UAE Cabinet Affairs & The Future announced ten key changes to take the summit to a new global level. The changes included changing the summit's name from Government Summit to World Government Summit, changing the entity structure and adopting the goal of providing integrated knowledge services for over 150 governments and global organizations.

In 2016, the World Government Summit Organization adopted a new year-round membership system. Members have exclusive invitations to attend the summit, communicate directly with its top speakers and attendees, receive reports issued by the summit ahead of general public, gain exclusive access to private functions held on the sidelines of events, and have access to training workshops and executive education programs hosted by the summit in collaboration with global experts.

Reports for the public about issues explored at the summits are issued by Oxford Analytica, Mackenzie and Harvard Business Review, on the World Government Summit website, and  conferences speeches are available on the Youtube Channel for the World Government Summit.

Themes 
The first World Government Summit was held in Dubai in 2013, and has been held annually since then. In 2013, themes included building citizen trust in governmental entities, social media as a tool for civic engagement, private-public sector partnerships, and measuring development.

In 2014, themes included partnerships and innovation in government service delivery, government smart toolboxes (using information technology for citizen engagement, anti-corruption efforts and helping citizens affected by conflict) and digital government.

In 2015, themes included smart cities, innovation, and better jobs.

In 2016, themes included the Sustainable Development Goals, the state of sustainability, and advanced science and the future of government (robotics and artificial intelligence, genomic medicine and biometrics). In 2016, the summit included an inaugural Best Minister in the World award  which was awarded to Greg Hunt, at that time Australian Minister of Federal Environment, later appointed as Australian Minister of Health.

In 2017, the summit focused on four main themes: 1) climate change & food security, 2) citizen well-being & happiness, 3) government agility and geopolitics & humanitarian aid, with the goal of focusing on fundamental questions that aim to pave the way for that future across the globe. The summit was held under the patronage of Mohammed bin Rashid Al Maktoum, the Vice President and Prime Minister of the UAE and ruler of Dubai, and included participation of seven international organizations as strategic partners, including the International Monetary Fund, the United Nations, UNESCO, Organisation for Economic Cooperation and Development (OECD) and the World Economic Forum.

In 2018, the themes included artificial intelligence and happiness.

Speakers 
World Government Summit speakers have included: 

 Queen Rania Al Abdullah, The Hashemite Kingdom of Jordan
 Ban Ki-moon, secretary general of the United Nations
 Jennifer Blanke, chief economist, World Economic Forum
 Boo Keun Yoon, CEO, Samsung Electronics Co.
 Richard Branson, founder, Virgin Group
 Dan Buettner, National Geographic Fellow, The Blue Zones
 Kathy Calvin, president and chief executive officer of the United Nations Foundation
 Deepak Chopra, author
 Martine Durand, OECD chief statistician and director of statistics 
 Malcolm Gladwell, author 
 Jose Angel Gurria, secretary general of the OECD
 Arianna Huffington, founder of Thrive Global 
 Paul Kagame, President of Rwanda  
 Travis Kalanick, co-founder of Uber
 Jim Yong Kim, president of The World Bank Group
 Kent Larson, Director, City Science, MIT Media Lab
 Sheikh Mohammad Bin Rashid Al Maktoum, vice president and Prime Minister of the UAE and Ruler of Dubai 
 Narendra Modi, Prime Minister of India 
 Elon Musk, technology entrepreneur; co-founder and CEO of SpaceX; co-founder and CEO of Tesla
 Joseph Muscat, Prime Minister of Malta
 Sheikh Mohammed Bin Zayed Al Nahyan, Crown Prince of Abu Dhabi and Deputy Supreme Commander of the UAE Armed Forces
 Barack Obama, former US President
 Klaus Schwab, founder and executive chairman of the World Economic Forum
 Andrew Weil, MD, author
 Steve Wozniak, co-founder of Apple Inc
 Muhammad Yunus, Nobel Peace Prize Laureate
 José Zapatero, former Prime Minister of Spain
 AbdulLatif Al Zayani, secretary general, Gulf Cooperation Council
Imran Khan, Prime Minister of Pakistan
Neil deGrasse Tyson, Astrophysicist, Director of The Hayden Planetarium

Forums and Events

Museum of the Future 
The Museum of the Future, is one of the exhibitions within the World Government Summit. The Museum of the Future features exhibitions exploring the future of science, technology and innovation. In 2016, the Museum of the Future's displays included an installment about a trip to the year 2035 where it showcased how technology could evolve and be used to manage complex social end economic systems. In 2017, the museum included a display with an air taxi, 3-D printed seeds and food, and an announcement by His Highness Sheikh Mohammad Bin Rashid Al Maktoum to colonize Mars by 2117. In 2018, Dubai 10x 2.0 was featured, with expositions about plans to integrate A.I. into many aspects of government and rapidly develop Dubai's governmental and private sector services.

Global Dialogue for Happiness 

In 2017, the World Government Summit held the first Global Dialogue for Happiness, a one-day event prior to the summit. It was convened by the UAE Minister of State for Happiness and Wellbeing, Her Excellency Ohood bint Khalfan Al Roomi. Speakers at the first summit included editors of the World Happiness Report, Jeffrey Sachs, John F. Helliwell, and Richard Layard, positive psychologists Edward Diener, Mihaly Csikszentmihalyi, Martin Seligman, and policy makers including the Prime Minister of Bhutan Tshering Tobgay, Head of the UN Development Programme Helen Clark, Bhutanese Gross National Happiness official Karma Ura.  It was an invitation-only event for approximately 200 people. The event was expanded to approximately 600 people in 2018.  The first Global Happiness Policy Report was issued by the World Happiness Council, a council conceived of by the Minister of State for Happiness and Wellbeing under the umbrella of the Global Dialogue for Happiness. In 2018, His Highness Sheikh Mohammed bin Rashid Al Maktoum convened six nations, the United Arab Emirates, Costa Rica, Portugal, Slovenia, Mexico, and Kazakhstan to establish the Global Happiness Coalition, an agreement to cooperate on an international level to bring happiness to the forefront for government.

Global Artificial Intelligence Forum 
In 2018, the first Global Artificial Intelligence Forum was convened.  The forum brought together approximately 100 people, including representatives of the  OECD, IEEE, U.N., and the private sector.  Discussion topics included a Global Strategy for the Governance for A.I., which will include policy recommendations. The AI Initiative which is part of The Future Society was contracted to steward the forum. The goal of the first forum was to identify guidelines for the global governance of Artificial Intelligence.

Awards 

 The Best Minister Award commends the extraordinary work of government ministers at demonstrating excellence in the public sector; 
 Global Universities Challenge the Challenge brings together over 100 students from renowned universities across the globe and engages them in an innovative competition to improve the way governments work.
 GovTech Prize. As part of the World Government Summit, the United Arab Emirates runs the “GovTech Prize”, an annual global award that is designed to motivate world government entities, startups to create and innovate GovTech solutions that help contribute to solving common global pressing challenges.
 Edge of Government innovation experience challenges visitors to think in new and often counter-intuitive ways about how to solve the most pressing public challenges of our time. 
 World Data Visualization Prize. Introduced in 2019 edition, the prize focuses on how governments are improving citizens’ lives, and the innovations - seen and unseen - that drive and measure success in this realm.

References

External links

</ref>
<

Events in Dubai
Diplomatic conferences